Archaeological Seminars Institute, Ltd. is a private company based in Jerusalem, Israel that deals with archaeology and tourism. Founded in 1981 by archaeologist Bernie Alpert and his wife, Fran Alpert, as an educational tourist facility and joined in 1985 by archaeologist Dr. Ian Stern, Archaeological Seminars Institute runs the “Dig for a Day” program in Maresha and hires out licensed tour guides for private walking tours. 
 
The company also ran an official English-language tour guide course for ten years.
 
“Dig for a Day” is a three-hour family activity that includes participating in an official archaeological excavation, licensed by the Israel Antiquities Authority, in one of the thousands of caves in the area of Maresha.  Following an introductory explanation that provides context for the excavation, the participants then descend into one of the subterranean complexes.  Inside these caves they excavate and then, above ground, sift through the material they have dug up.  Afterwards, they go on a tour (a “crawl”) of an unexcavated cave system.  Each group has its own guide for the duration of the activity. The dig ends with a short summation describing some of the most important finds, some of which are now displayed in the Israel Museum in Jerusalem.
 
Clients pay for the activity which provides funds for the ongoing excavation as well as paying for staff.  Many participants consider the dig “the highlight” of their visit to Israel.
 
Archaeological Seminars Institute is now run by Dr. Ian Stern and his wife, Heidi Stern. The Maresha Excavation Project is operated as a full-fledged research project under the academic umbrella of the Nelson Glueck School of Biblical Archaeology of the Hebrew Union College-Jewish Institute of Religion.

See also
Maresha
Beit Guvrin (disambiguation)

References

External links

Archaeological Seminars Institute social media – Facebook page, revealing rare finds from the excavation as well as the excavators who found them. 
Bet Guvrin-Maresha National Park official site
Pictures of Maresha

Ancient Israel and Judah
Archaeological sites in Israel
Edom
Hasmonean dynasty
Education companies of Israel
Cultural tourism